Alkekongen is an islet in Brækmoholmane, part of Thousand Islands, an island group south of Edgeøya. Its name is derived from the fact that thousands of little auks breed among the boulders of the island.

References

 Norwegian Polar Institute Place Names of Svalbard Database

Islands of Svalbard